Anniston City Schools is the public school district of Anniston, Alabama. Anniston City Schools serves 1,898 students and employs 100 teachers and 98 staff as of the 2020–2021 school year. The district includes three elementary schools, one middle school, and one high school.

Schools
Anniston City Schools consists of five schools:

 Cobb Preparatory Academy (PK-K)
 Golden Springs Elementary School (1-5)
 Randolph Park Elementary School (1-5)
 Anniston Middle School (6-8)
 Anniston High School (9-12)

The district's Tenth Street Elementary School was closed in 2021.

Failing schools
Statewide testing ranks the schools in Alabama. Those in the bottom six percent are listed as "failing." As of early 2018, Anniston High School was included in this category.

Continuing Improvement Program
Anniston City Schools have adopted a Continuing Improvement Program to monitor Adequate Yearly Progress (AYP) under the No Child Left Behind initiative. For school year 2010–2011, the High School made adequate yearly progress in math but not in reading. In grades 6 through 8 it was the other way round. In grades 3 through 5 the goals were not met in either reading or math.

Five-year strategic plan
The system has a five-year strategic plan designed to address perceived shortcomings such as poor facilities, lack of discipline, lack of community support, inadequate funding, and an emphasis on athletics at the expense of academic progress. The top priorities were seen as improving test scores, boosting community and business involvement, and improving relationships between parents and teachers.

Sports
Anniston High School's basketball coach since 1997 has been Schuessler L. Ware, named Alabama State 4-A Coach of the Year for 2011.

Discipline
In December 2004 the School Board decided to retain the use of corporal punishment. Under the policy, principals and teachers may paddle students for minor or intermediate violations of the disciplinary code.

At Anniston High School, only the Principal or Vice Principal may spank students. Parents who do not wish corporal punishment to be used must sign a form asking that some other penalty be applied.

In academic year 2008-09 there were 528 disciplinary paddlings in the Anniston schools system, none of which occurred at the High School.

External links 
 Anniston City Schools website

References

School districts in Alabama
Education in Calhoun County, Alabama
Anniston, Alabama
1909 establishments in Alabama
School districts established in 1909